Yoshkar-Ola Airport  is an airport in Mari El Republic, Russia, located  north of Yoshkar-Ola and  from Moscow Domodedovo Airport (DME).

As a category 2 airport (based on an MAK classification),
it handles Tu-134, Yak-42 and smaller aircraft.

The airport is the base for Yoshkar-Ola Joint Aviation Group.

Airlines and destinations

External links
  Yoshkar-Ola Airport Official Site

References

Airports built in the Soviet Union
Airports in Mari El